Tæt På - Live is a live album released by Danish-Chilean singer Medina.  It was released on 17 March 2014 as a digital download in Denmark. The album peaked at number 2 on the Danish Albums Chart.

Singles
"Jalousi" was released as the lead single from the album on 3 February 2014. The song peaked at number 1 on the Danish Singles Chart.

Track listing

Chart performance

Release history

References

2014 live albums
Medina (singer) albums